Janina Faye Smigielski (born 1948) is an English actress and director. She is a daughter of Florence Louisa Jonathan and Jan Smigielski. Her father was a Polish pilot from No. 303 Squadron RAF during the Battle of Britain.

Faye began her career as an actress in 1956, and it includes theatre and television work in addition to many film appearances. She appeared in several major fantasy and horror films when she was young, such as Hammer Films' original version of Dracula (1958), as well as the same company’s Never Take Sweets from a Stranger (1960) and The Two Faces of Dr. Jekyll (1960). In 1961 she appeared on stage as Helen Keller in the William Gibson play The Miracle Worker, and in 1962 she appeared in the film thrillers Don't Talk to Strange Men and  The Day of the Triffids.

In 1998, she teamed up with director Paul Cotgrove and Hammer co-star Ingrid Pitt to make the short British horror film Green Fingers, a story about a spinster whose garden has strange properties with an ability to grow anything, even things that are no longer living.

She often appears at signings.

Filmography

References

External links
 Official Website
 

Living people
1948 births
20th-century English actresses
Actresses from London
People from Hammersmith
English film actresses
English people of Polish descent
English television actresses